Heilman is an unincorporated community in Pigeon Township, Warrick County, in the U.S. state of Indiana.

History
A post office was established at Heilman in 1881, and remained in operation until 1903. Heilman was named after a local family of settlers.

Geography

References

Unincorporated communities in Warrick County, Indiana
Unincorporated communities in Indiana